Glasgow station is a train station in Glasgow, Montana. The station is served by Amtrak's daily Empire Builder line. The station, platform, and parking are owned by BNSF Railway.

In 2005, Glasgow saw 4.5% of Montana's twelve passenger stations’ total traffic.

Station layout

Bibliography

References

External links 

Glasgow Amtrak Station (USA RailGuide – Train Web)

Amtrak stations in Montana
Buildings and structures in Valley County, Montana
Former Great Northern Railway (U.S.) stations
Glasgow, Montana
1893 establishments in Montana
Railway stations in the United States opened in 1893